Páramo (Parmu) is one of thirteen parishes (administrative divisions) in Teverga, a municipality within the province and autonomous community of Asturias, in northern Spain.

The postal code is 33111.

Villages and hamlets
Páramo 
Villa de Sub (La Villa)

References

Parishes in Teverga